Conasprella josei is a species of sea snail, a marine gastropod mollusc in the family Conidae, the cone snails, cone shells or cones.

Distribution
This marine species occurs in the Atlantic Ocean off Bahia, Brazil.

References

 Petuch E.J. & Berschauer D.P. (2016). Six new species of gastropods (Fasciolariidae, Conidae, and Conilithidae) from Brazil. The Festivus. 48(4): 257–266.

josei
Gastropods described in 2016